Broken Picture Telephone, sometimes abbreviated BPT, was a collaborative multiplayer online drawing and writing game invented in 2007, based on the pen-and-paper game Telephone Pictionary.

Gameplay 
Like the children's game called broken telephone or simply telephone, also known as Chinese whispers, Broken Picture Telephone relies on the breakdown of communications for entertainment value. Broken Picture Telephone gameplay involves a series of 11 or more rounds per game, in which each player can participate in only one round per game. The first and last rounds always require a text contribution; written-contribution turns alternate with drawing-contribution rounds. Whichever player is randomly selected to play round two creates a drawing based on the text provided in round one; the next randomly selected player writes a description of the drawing from round two; the round four player draws whatever the round three player described; and so on.

For writing rounds, there is a character limit constraining possible submissions. For drawing rounds, the tools provided are rudimentary, consisting of eleven colors and a few brush sizes in the 2009 edition of the game. Each player has a maximum of ten minutes to submit their description or drawing. Games persist on the BrokenPictureTelephone.com site until finished, so that players can join a game hours or even days after it was begun. Until each game is concluded by the submission of its final text round, the full sequence of rounds is not visible to any site visitor, and when playing a round, players can see only the round immediately preceding their own.

In order to deter inappropriate user behavior, players must register using a valid email address. Games with mature content are flagged as such by users—either the player who added the mature content, or any other user who views the game—and users can opt not to be shown any games with content flagged as mature.

History 
Broken Picture Telephone was created by American indie developer Alishah Novin in 2007. After Jay Is Games published a review of the game in June of that year, the influx of new players temporarily overwhelmed the BrokenPictureTelephone.com servers even though the game had been migrated to new servers in anticipation of such an increase in site visitors. Problems with server load continued, along with some bugs in the game's code and issues with malicious users trolling games; Novin took the game offline in 2010. Only a message saying that development was continuing to address the problems with the game's functionality remained accessible on the website. An Android app version of the game was released 13 October 2012, with the first bugfix release, numbered 1.01, following on 16 October. The browser version of the game remained defunct for several years until it was relaunched in 2013.

Reception 
Broken Picture Telephone was rated #62 in PC Magazine list of the Top 100 Web Sites of 2009, and #5 in Jay Is Games's top ten games of 2009 in the Simple Idea category. Gamezebo praised the way its gameplay "tends to rapidly degenerate into hilarious misunderstandings" and called it "maybe one of the greatest online games ever." Appszoom magazine called the Android release "insanely-addicting", and Jay Is Games noted that site visitors "can spend a lot of time just browsing through the archives of completed games and laughing at the results." Academic analysis has identified BPT with the New Games movement, due to its goal being "a shared fun experience, rather than one team winning and one losing."

Numerous gaming-review sites lamented the 2010 shuttering of the game.

Similar games 
Online multiplayer games with similar mechanisms of play, some of which were first released during the period when BPT was not available, include Broken Phone, DoodleOrDie, Drawception, DrawGuess and Teledraw.

Screenshots

References

External links 
 
 A video tutorial for creating "artistic" entries using the 2009 BPT interface

2009 video games
2012 video games
2013 video games
Android (operating system) games
Art games
Browser games
Collaborative software
Cooperative video games
Freeware games
Indie video games
IOS games
Multiplayer video games
Video games developed in the United States